Lars Gunnar Wiklund (17 August 1935 – 29 September 1989) was a Swedish singer. He scored several Svensktoppen hits, and participated in Melodifestivalen four times.

Early life 

Lars Gunnar Wiklund was born on 17 August 1935 in Luleå, Sweden, as the first child of Ellen and Sven Wiklund.

Discography 

 Gunnar Wiklund (1960)
 32´29 minuter med Gunnar Wiklund (1966)
 Gunnar Wiklund sjunger Jim Reeves (1970)
 Minnenas melodier (1979)

Famous Gunnar Wiklund songs
Minns du den sommar (Greenfields)
Regntunga skyar
Vi ska gå hand i hand (Dunja, du)
Han måste gå (1960, previously recorded by Cacka Israelsson in 1959, a Swedish cover of Jim Reeves' He'll Have to Go, 1959)
Mest av allt
Kan jag hjälpa att jag älskar dig ännu
Man ska visa lite ömhet mot varandra
Snart så kommer åter ljusa tider
Akta dig för indianerna
Nu tändas åter ljusen i min lilla stad
Glöm din dröm
I en röd liten stuga
Ensam – Georgia on my mind
Känn dig lite happy
En gång i vårt sommarland (Greensleeves)

Citations

External links 

 
 

1935 births
1989 deaths
20th-century Swedish male singers
People from Luleå
Melodifestivalen contestants